Hanoi–Haiphong Expressway (Vietnamese: Đường cao tốc Hà Nội - Hải Phòng, labelled CT.04) is one of Vietnam's controlled-access highways, running for  connecting Hanoi to Haiphong. It runs nearly parallel to National Route 5 and Hanoi–Haiphong railway. The expressway is a major freight corridor for Vietnam's Northern Pivotal Economic Region as well as the Kunming-Hanoi-Haiphong Economic Corridor. It is abbreviated as CT.04. 

The six-lane expressway was developed under build-operation-transfer contracts. The construction of the expressway was started on 2 February 2009 and finished on 5 December 2015. This road allows people to drive up to 120km/h.

The West end of the expressway is at the north of Thanh Trì Bridge in Hanoi and the East end at Đình Vũ Dike in Haiphong.

References

Expressways in Vietnam